JKR or Jkr. may refer to:

 Janakpur Airport in Nepal
 J. K. Rowling, author of the Harry Potter series
 Johnson-Kendall-Roberts model in contact mechanics
 Jones Knowles Ritchie, a British design agency
 Junker (Jkr.), a German noble honorific
 Malaysian Public Works Department